Nikola Gnjatović (born 15 September 1979) is a Serbian former professional tennis player.

Gnjatović was born in Vračar, Belgrade and started out at the Košutnjak tennis club. When he was 16 he won Yugoslavia's national under 18s championship in both singles and doubles. Srđan Đoković, father of Novak, once said that he had never seen a more talented player. In 1999 he represented the Yugoslavia Davis Cup team for a tie against Morocco in Casablanca. His career however soon unravelled after he began taking heroin. He became addicted to the drug and over a 17 year period was hospitalised on numerous occasions, but is now clean.

ITF Futures finals

Doubles: 4 (3–1)

See also
List of Serbia Davis Cup team representatives

References

External links
 
 
 

1979 births
Living people
Serbian male tennis players
Serbia and Montenegro male tennis players
Tennis players from Belgrade